Viktor Ivanovich Belenko (born 15 February 1947) is a Russian-born American aerospace engineer and former Soviet pilot who defected in 1976 to the West while flying his MiG-25 jet interceptor (NATO reporting name: "Foxbat") and landed in Hakodate, Japan. George H. W. Bush, the Director of Central Intelligence at the time, called the opportunity to examine the plane up close an "intelligence bonanza" for the West. Belenko later became a U.S. aerospace engineer.

Early life and defection

Belenko was born in Nalchik, Russian SFSR, in a Russian family (his passport states his ethnicity as Russian). Lieutenant Belenko was a pilot with the 513th Fighter Regiment, 11th Air Army, Soviet Air Defence Forces based in Chuguyevka, Primorsky Krai. On 6 September 1976, he successfully defected to the West by flying his MiG-25 jet fighter to Hakodate Airport, Hokkaido Japan.

This was the first time that Western military intelligence were able to get a close look at the aircraft and its specifications, and many secrets and surprises were revealed. His defection caused significant damage to the Soviet Air Force. Belenko was granted asylum by U.S. President Gerald Ford, and a trust fund was set up for him, which granted him a very comfortable living in later years. The US government debriefed him for five months after his defection and employed him as a consultant for several years thereafter. Belenko had brought with him the pilot's manual for the MiG-25 since he expected to assist US pilots in evaluating and testing the aircraft.

Belenko was not the only pilot to have defected from the Soviet Union in this way or even the first such to defect from a Soviet-bloc country. He may have been aware of the US government's policy of awarding large cash prizes to defecting pilots of communist countries. In March and May 1953, two Polish Air Force pilots flew MiG-15s to Denmark. Later in 1953, North Korean pilot No Kum Sok flew his MiG-15 to a US air base in South Korea; the MiG is in the permanent collection of the National Museum of the U.S. Air Force, displayed in its original owner markings. Later, Soviet Captain Aleksandr Zuyev flew his MiG-29 to Trabzon, Turkey, on 20 May 1989. That MiG-29 was promptly returned to the Soviets.

Aftermath
The MiG-25's arrival in Japan was a windfall for Western military planners. The Japanese government originally allowed the United States only to examine the plane and to conduct ground tests of the radar and engines, but it subsequently invited the US to examine the plane extensively. It was dismantled for that purpose in Japan.  The plane was moved by a US Air Force C-5 Galaxy cargo aircraft from Hakodate to Hyakuri Air Base on 25 September, and by then, experts had determined that the plane was an interceptor, not a fighter-bomber, which was a welcome reassurance for Japanese defense planners.

The Japanese government laid out a plan on 2 October 1976 to return the aircraft in crates from the port of Hitachi and bill the Soviets US$40,000 for crating services and airfield damage at Hakodate. The Soviets unsuccessfully tried to negotiate a return via one of their own Antonov An-22 aircraft and to organize a rigorous inspection of the crates, but Japan refused both demands, and the Soviets finally submitted to the Japanese terms on 22 October 1976. The aircraft was moved from Hyakuri to the port of Hitachi on 11 November 1976 on a convoy of trailers. It left in 30 crates aboard the Soviet cargo ship Taigonos on 15 November 1976 and arrived about three days later in Vladivostok. A team of Soviet technicians had been allowed to view subassemblies at Hitachi, and upon finding 20 missing parts, one being film of the flight to Hakodate, the Soviets attempted to charge Japan US $10 million. Neither the Japanese nor the Soviet bill is known to have been paid.

A senior diplomat described the Soviet position as "sulky about the whole affair." The CIA concluded at the time that "both countries seem anxious to put the problem behind them" and speculated that the Soviets were reluctant to cancel a series of upcoming diplomatic visits because "some useful business is likely to be transacted, and because the USSR, with its political standing in Tokyo so low, can ill afford setbacks in Soviet–Japanese economic cooperation."

Life in the United States
In 1980, the US Congress enacted S. 2961, authorizing citizenship for Belenko. It was signed into law by President Jimmy Carter on 14 October 1980, as Private Law 96-62.

After his defection, Belenko co-wrote a 1980 autobiography, MiG Pilot: The Final Escape of Lieutenant Belenko with Reader's Digest writer John Barron.

While he resided in the United States, Belenko married a music teacher from North Dakota, Coral, and fathered two sons, Tom and Paul. He later divorced. He also has a son from his first marriage. Belenko has never divorced his Russian wife. After the dissolution of the Soviet Union, he visited Moscow in 1995 on business.

Belenko almost never appears in interviews. However, in a brief and informal bar interview in 2000 in which he posed for pictures and responded to questions, he said that he was happy in the United States. Belenko remarked in the interview that "[Americans] have tolerance regarding other people's opinion. In certain cultures, if you do not accept the mainstream, you would be booted out or might disappear. Here we have people—you know, who hug trees, and people who want to cut them down—and they live side by side!"

The Soviet Union repeatedly spread false stories about Belenko being killed in a car accident, returning to Russia, being arrested and executed, or otherwise brought to justice.

See also

 Aleksandr Zuyev (pilot)
 List of Cold War pilot defections
 List of Soviet and Eastern Bloc defectors

References

Further reading 
MiG Pilot: the Final Escape of Lt. Belenko, by John Barron, 1980,

External links

 Article 'Mission "Foxbat': Almost 30 years ago Senior Lieutenant Belenko hijacked the Mig-25 fighter from the Sokolovka air base to Japan."
Article on Belenko at Everything2
Chris Dixon. A Reporter's Online Notebook: Victor Belenko.
Image of Viktor Ivanovich Belenko, Soviet defector, being led by a decoy at Los Angeles International Airport, California, 1976. Los Angeles Times Photographic Archive (Collection 1429). UCLA Library Special Collections, Charles E. Young Research Library, University of California, Los Angeles.

1947 births
Living people
Primorsky Krai
American aerospace engineers
Soviet Air Force officers
Soviet defectors to the United States
Japan–Soviet Union relations
Ukrainian expatriates in the United States
Soviet Air Defence Force officers
People from Nalchik